Mount Habrich is a mountain summit located in British Columbia, Canada.

Description 
It is part of the North Shore Mountains which are a subrange of the Coast Mountains. Precipitation runoff from the peak drains north into the Stawamus River, and southwest to Howe Sound via Shannon Creek. Mount Habrich is more notable for its steep rise above local terrain than for its absolute elevation.

History 
The first ascent of the summit was made in July 1912 by Don Munday, Fred Smith and C. Field via the northeast ridge. The first ascent party named the mountain "Eagle Head" for the shape of its profile as seen from Sky Pilot. The mountain's present toponym was officially adopted June 2, 1955, by the Geographical Names Board of Canada to remember Samuel A. Habrich, a local prospector who built trails in this area in the early 1900s.

Climate 
Based on the Köppen climate classification, Mount Habrich is located in the marine west coast climate zone of western North America. Most weather fronts originate in the Pacific Ocean, and travel east toward the Coast Mountains where they are forced upward by the range (Orographic lift), causing them to drop their moisture in the form of rain or snowfall. As a result, the Coast Mountains experience high precipitation, especially during the winter months in the form of snowfall. Temperatures in winter can drop below −20 °C with wind chill factors below −30 °C.

Climbing
Climbing routes on Mt. Habrich:
 Northeast Ridge -  scrambling
 Life In Space - 
 Life On Earth - class 5.10c
 Escape Velocity - class 5.9
 Solar System - class 5.10a

See also 
 Geography of British Columbia

References

External links
 Mount Habrich: weather forecast
 Mt. Habrich (photo): Flickr
 Mt. Habrich Rock Climbing: Mountainproject.com
 Mount Habrich: ukclimbing.com

One-thousanders of British Columbia
North Shore Mountains
Squamish-Lillooet Regional District
Sea-to-Sky Corridor